Emma O'Driscoll (born 22 April 2000) is an Australian rules footballer playing for the Fremantle Football Club in the AFL Women's (AFLW).

AFLW career

O'Driscoll was drafted by Fremantle with their fourth selection, 51st overall, in the 2019 AFL Women's draft after playing for Swan Districts in the West Australian Women's Football League (WAWFL).

O'Driscoll was named in the 22under22 team during both the 2021 AFLW season and the 2022 AFLW season. O'Driscoll was again named in the 22under22 team for her third consecutive season following the AFL Women's season seven.

O'Driscoll grew up in Northam Western Australia, her younger brother Nathan was also drafted by Fremantle with the 27th selection in the 2020 AFL draft.

References

External links 

Living people
2000 births
Fremantle Football Club (AFLW) players
Australian rules footballers from Western Australia